Hori was a Vizier of Ancient Egypt. He served during the reign of pharaohs Sethi II, Siptah, Tawosret, Setnakhte and Ramesses III.

Family
Hori (II) was the son of the High Priest of Ptah Hori I and the grandson of Prince Khaemweset. And hence a direct descendant of Pharaoh Ramesses II.

Biography
Hori served as Vizier from the reign of Sety II to the 16th year of Ramesses III. Hori succeeded the vizier Paraemheb in office.
Hori was succeeded in office by the Vizier To by year 16 of the reign of Pharaoh Ramesses III. Perhaps another vizier, possibly of the North of Egypt and named Hewernef, also succeeded Hori during the reign of Ramesses III, but this depends on the reading of a short, unclear text written on an ostrakon from Deir el-Medina which is now in the National Archaeological Museum of Florence (inv. no. 2619).

Ancestry

References

Ancient Egyptian viziers
People of the Nineteenth Dynasty of Egypt
People of the Twentieth Dynasty of Egypt